The name Patsy has been used for eight tropical cyclones worldwide, seven exclusively in the Western Pacific Ocean and one formed in the Central Pacific Ocean and crossed the International Dateline into the Western Pacific.
 
 Typhoon Patsy (1955) (T5527) – Category 4 super typhoon, struck the Philippines as a tropical storm
 Hurricane Patsy (1959) (T5912, 29W) (Typhoon Patsy) – Category 5 hurricane and Category 4-equivalent typhoon, crossed the International Dateline twice, and remained in the open ocean
 Typhoon Patsy (1962) (T6211, 51W) – struck Samar, in the Philippines, and China
 Typhoon Patsy (1965) (T6501, 01W, Bining) – struck the Philippines
 Tropical Storm Patsy (1967) (T6723, 26W) – struck China and North Vietnam
 Typhoon Patsy (1970) (T7025, 27W, Yoling) – Category 4 super typhoon, struck the Philippines and North Vietnam
 Typhoon Patsy (1973) (T7317, 19W, Miling) – Category 5-equivalent super typhoon, brushed the Philippines
 Tropical Storm Patsy (1977) (T7701, 01W) – remained out at sea

Pacific typhoon set index articles
Pacific hurricane set index articles